The 1958 All-Southwest Conference football team consists of American football players chosen by various organizations for All-Southwest Conference teams for the 1958 NCAA University Division football season.  The selectors for the 1958 season included the Associated Press (AP) and the United Press International (UPI).  Players selected as first-team players by both the AP and UP are designated in bold.

All Southwest selections

Backs
 Don Meredith, SMU (AP-1; UPI-1 [QB])
 Marvin Lasater, TCU (AP-1; UPI-1 [HB])
 Jim Mooty, Arkansas (AP-1; UPI-1 [HB])
 Jack Spikes, TCU (AP-1; UPI-1 [FB])
 Charlie Milstead, Texas A&M (AP-1)

Ends
 Buddy Dial, Rice (AP-1; UPI-1)
 John Tracey, Texas A&M (AP-1; UPI-1)

Tackles
 Don Floyd, TCU (AP-1; UPI-1)
 J. D. Smith, Rice (AP-1; UPI-1)

Guards
 Charley Horton, Baylor (AP-1; UPI-1)
 Tom Koenig, SMU (AP-1; UPI-1)

Centers
 Dale Walker, TCU (AP-1; UPI-1)

Key
AP = Associated Press

UPI = United Press International

Bold = Consensus first-team selection of both the AP and UP

See also
1958 College Football All-America Team

References

All-Southwest Conference
All-Southwest Conference football teams